Mormon pornography is a subgenre of pornography themed around the Mormon religion. According to the journalist Isha Aran, The Church of Jesus Christ of Latter-day Saints (LDS Church) views Mormon pornography as blasphemous, and most directors and performers in Mormon pornography are ex-Mormons. Mormon pornography typically depicts sex acts between actors and/or actresses portraying members of the LDS Church. Mormon elders are depicted as domineering over their multiple wives, who obediently submit to their husband's commands, treating participation in the act as a sacred duty. Performers may be (initially) dressed in Mormon underwear, and the setting may be the inside of a Mormon temple. In accordance with stereotyped Mormon norms, profane language is absent.

Aran writes that the genre originated in 2010 with the launch of the gay pornography site MormonBoyz.com. Website founder Legrand Wolf claims to have graduated from Brigham Young University with a doctoral degree, as well as being an ex-Mormon. The site MormonGirlz.com,  launched in 2014, by a woman known in the industry as Brooke Hunter, a 33-year-old ex-Mormon, features both heterosexual and lesbian relationships between Mormon characters.

See also

 Convent pornography
 Homosexuality and The Church of Jesus Christ of Latter-day Saints
 Law of chastity
 Masturbation and The Church of Jesus Christ of Latter-day Saints
 Mormon cinema
 Nunsploitation
 Pornographic actresses of a Mormon background
 Annette Haven
 Belladonna
 Religious views on pornography
 Sexuality and Mormonism

References

External links
 
 

Pornography
Pornography
Pornography by genre
Pornography